Cédric Ouattara (born 15 November 1983 in Amiens) is a French professional football player. Currently, he plays in the Championnat de France amateur for USL Dunkerque. He also holds Ivorian citizenship.

He played on the professional level in Ligue 2 for FC Lorient.

1983 births
Living people
French footballers
Sportspeople from Amiens
French sportspeople of Ivorian descent
Ligue 2 players
FC Lorient players
FC Martigues players
SO Châtellerault players
Association football forwards
Footballers from Hauts-de-France